Coysh is a surname. Notable people with the surname include:

 John Coysh (fl. 17th century), English actor
 Sarah Coysh (c. 1742–1801), British heiress